At the 1968 Summer Olympics, fourteen different artistic gymnastics events were contested, eight for men and six for women.  All events were held at the National Auditorium in Mexico City from October 21 through October 26.

Format of competition
The scoring in all the events was similar to that of the gymnastics events at the 1960 Summer Olympics. The six best gymnasts on the apparatus in the team competition (by sum of two scores - for compulsory and optional routine) qualified for that apparatus finals. The new feature of the competition was in women's events: each of them was judged by four judges, like the men's competition. The highest and lowest marks were dropped and an average of two remaining marks constituted the score.

Results

Men's events

Women's events

Medal table

Controversy
Larisa Petrik’s gold medal on floor was controversial because it originally appeared that Čáslavská won outright. After the competition was concluded, Petrik's prelims score was corrected, elevating her to let her tie with Čáslavská.  (In the initial calculations of the final standings, an incorrect prelims score for Petrik was entered.) Sharing the medal podium, Čáslavská lowered her heard and looked to the side with the Soviet anthem played - publicly defy the Soviets who had recently invaded her home country. A similar controversy occurred jn the balance beam, where Čáskavská was denied gold altogether.

See also
Olympic medalists in gymnastics (men)
Olympic medalists in gymnastics (women)

References

External links
 Official Olympic Report
 www.gymnasticsresults.com
 www.gymn-forum.net

 
1968
1968 Summer Olympics events
1968 in gymnastics